Scott Davis and Robert Van't Hof were the defending champions, but faced each other in this edition, with different partners. Davis, teaming up with David Pate, defeated Van't Hof and Andy Kohlberg in the first round. Davis and Pate were eliminated in quarterfinals to Christo Steyn and Danie Visser.

Stefan Edberg and Anders Järryd won the title by defeating Peter Fleming and John McEnroe 3–6, 7–5, 7–6(9–7) in the final.

Seeds

Draw

Draw

References

External links
 Official results archive (ATP)
 Official results archive (ITF)

Los Angeles Open (tennis)
1986 Grand Prix (tennis)
Volvo Tennis Los Angeles
Volvo Tennis Los Angeles